Hoxa is a small settlement on the island of South Ronaldsay in the Orkney Islands north of mainland Scotland.

Thorfinn Turf-Einarsson the 10th century Norse Earl of Orkney (aka Thorfinn Skullsplitter) may be buried at the site of The Howe broch just north of  Hoxa.

References

External links
 The Megalithic Portal - Howe of Hoxa
 Canmore - Hoxa Head Balfour Battery site record
 Northern Lighthouse Board 

Villages in Orkney
Orkneyinga saga places